The Ark is an American science fiction television series created by Dean Devlin and Jonathan Glassner, who also serve as showrunners for the series. It  premiered on Syfy on February 1, 2023, and is to consist of twelve episodes. The series stars Christie Burke as Lt. Sharon Garnet who becomes the de facto captain of an interstellar spacecraft after a disaster. It also stars Reece Ritchie, Richard Fleeshman, Stacey Michelle Read, Ryan Adams, Pavle Jerinić, Shalini Peiris, Christina Wolfe, and Tiana Upcheva.

Premise 
A hundred years in the future, the spacecraft known as Ark One suffers a catastrophic event one year from reaching its destination, Proxima b, causing massive destruction and loss of life. The remaining crew must work together to stay on course, and survive.

Cast and characters

Main 
 Christie Burke as Lt. Sharon Garnet, one of the three highest-ranking remaining members of the crew and the de facto captain of the ship after the disaster
 Reece Ritchie as Lt. Spencer Lane, one of the three highest-ranking remaining members of the crew; he is suspicious of Garnet's leadership
 Richard Fleeshman as Lt. James Brice, one of the three highest-ranking remaining members of the crew and a self-proclaimed "navigation wonk" who now has to take on other duties after the disaster
 Stacey Michelle Read as Alicia Nevins, a waste management engineer with coding skills who is promoted to chief of life support
 Ryan Adams as Angus Medford, a farm and 4-H youth from horticulture whose duties include crop development at the prospective colony
 Pavle Jerinić as Felix Strickland, acting head of security enforcement
 Shalini Peiris as Dr. Sanjivni Kabir, the only remaining doctor on the medical staff
 Christina Wolfe as Dr. Cat Brandice, a social media star and "TV relationship specialist" who Garnet orders to be the head of ship-wide mental health
 Tiana Upcheva as Eva Markovic, acting head of maintenance, engineering and construction

Supporting 

 Lisa Brenner as Lieutenant Commander Susan Ingram, who would be the commanding officer of the surviving crew
 Miles Barrow as Baylor Trent, an ensign and Ingram's protégé
 Dominik Čičak as Harris Beckner, a member of Eva's engineering team and her secret lover
 Chris Leask as Jasper Dades, a crew member with a secret

Episodes

Production 
The Ark went straight-to-series in late January 2022 with a 12-episode order from SyFy. Principal photography began at PFI Studios in Belgrade, Serbia in March of that year. Dean Devlin and Jonathan Glassner serve as showrunners and producers.

In March 2022, it was announced that the regular cast of the series had been set, with Christie Burke starring as Lt. Sharon Garnet, along with Richard Fleeshman, Reece Ritchie, Stacey Read, and newcomer Ryan Adams. In April 2022, it was announced that Lisa Brenner would be a recurring guest star, playing Commander Susan Ingram, with Christina Wolfe, Shalini Peiris, Miles Barrow, Pavle Jerinić, and Tiana Upcheva also recurring.

Broadcast and release 
The series trailer was released in December 2022. It premiered on Syfy on February 1, 2023, with episodes to be streamed the next day on Peacock.

References

External links 
 
 

2020s American drama television series
2020s American mystery television series
2020s American science fiction television series
2023 American television series debuts
English-language television shows
Post-apocalyptic television series
Syfy original programming
Television shows filmed in Serbia